I'd Like to Teach the World to Sing is a fifth album by singer and actress Lea Salonga. It was released three years after her multi-platinum selling album, Lea Salonga. It earned mixed reviews from critics. The album was a mixture of old and new recordings. One single was released from the album, the top ten hit, "Top of the World". The album went gold after six months of release.

Track listing 
Ngayon Pa Lang Tagumpay Ka Na (with Cris Villonco) 
I'd Like to Teach the World to Sing (In Perfect Harmony)
Rainbow Connection
Sing
Chiquitita
Happiness (with Gerard Salonga) 
Sa Ugoy Ng Duyan
Thank You for the Music
I am But a Small Voice 
Tomorrow
Someone's Waiting for You
Somewhere Over the Rainbow
Alphabet Song
When You Wish upon a Star
Mama
The Greatest Love of All 
Top of the World

References

Lea Salonga albums
1997 albums